Koch Peter Marx (born 21 January 1994) is a South African professional rugby union player for Jersey Reds in the RFU Championship. He can play as a centre or a winger.

Rugby career

Schools rugby

Marx was born in Johannesburg and grew up in Alberton, where he attended Hoërskool Alberton. He was also selected in a South Africa Schools squad that hosted their counterparts from France, Wales and England in an Under-18 International Series, but failed to feature in any of the matches.

Youth and Varsity Shield rugby

After school, he joined the Golden Lions Academy and was named in the  squad that participated in the 2013 Under-19 Provincial Championship. He started all twelve of their matches during the regular season, scoring five tries.

Marx was named in the ' squad for the 2014 Vodacom Cup, but didn't appear in any matches for the team. In the latter half of the year, he established himself in the  squad that participated in the 2014 Under-21 Provincial Championship, starting all thirteen of their matches during the competition. It proved to be a very prolific season for Koch as he scored a total of eleven tries, the joint-second most in Group A of the competition. He got another in their penultimate match of the season against the s, as his side finished in third position to qualify for the title play-offs. The last of his tries during the competition came in their semi-final match against the Blue Bulls, but it proved futile as the team from Pretoria won 23–19 to eliminate Koch's side from the competition.

He scored a try in their match against eventual champions  in a 40–26 victory and scored two tries against  a week later. He helped Wits finish top of the log, but didn't play in the final which UKZN won 29–24. He returned to the Under-21 side for their 2015 season, making ten starts and scoring tries against ,  and  during the regular season as the Lions secured the final play-off spot by finishing fourth, and scored a try in a semi-final defeat for the second year in a row as  won 43–20 to progress to the final at the Lions' expense.

Golden Lions / Lions

References

South African rugby union players
Living people
1994 births
Rugby union players from Johannesburg
Rugby union centres
Rugby union wings
Golden Lions players
Lions (United Rugby Championship) players